The 1938 United States Senate election in Maryland was held on November 8, 1938. Incumbent Democratic U.S. Senator Millard Tydings was re-elected to a third term in office, easily defeating Republican Oscar Leser.

Primary elections were held on September 12.  faced a primary challenge from U.S. Representative David John Lewis, who was backed by President Franklin D. Roosevelt in the President's attempt to purge the Democratic Party of conservatives. He survived comfortably by a two-to-one margin. Leser defeated Galen L. Tait for the Republican nomination.

, this was the last time a Democratic candidate for Senate won every county in Maryland.

Democratic primary

Candidates
Arthur E. Hungerford
David John Lewis, U.S. Representative from Cumberland
Millard Tydings, incumbent Senator since 1927

Campaign
Senator Millard Tydings, a member of the conservative Southern wing of the Democratic Party, was opposed to President Franklin Delano Roosevelt's New Deal from the beginning and voted against most of its provisions. Though Tydings began reconciliation with the administration over growing international concerns, Roosevelt's top priority in the 1938 midterms remained economic recovery and the Second New Deal. He privately told Interior Secretary Harold L. Ickes to "take Tydings' hide off and rub salt in it." Aware of Roosevelt's opposition and popularity, Tydings publicly insisted he supported the "bone and sinew" of the New Deal and that claims of his opposition were "silly propaganda."

The Roosevelt administration faced an uphill battle from the start. Tydings retained the backing of junior Senator George L. P. Radcliffe, a New Deal supporter who had been unaware that Roosevelt would target Tydings. The White House settled on U.S. Representative David John Lewis as their preferred candidate only after Lewis and Tydings had announced re-election campaigns and many county organizations had endorsed both men. Once Lewis did announce his challenge to Senator Tydings, leading Maryland Democrats declared neutrality.

Lewis, a former mine worker, did retain the backing of the labor movement in the state, including endorsements from the American Federation of Labor and John L. Lewis. Additional praise from the Maryland Communist Party, however, may have hampered his campaign. Tydings attacked Lewis for his ties to organized labor and appealed to unorganized farmers instead, while Lewis labeled Tydings a "Tory Republican" for his ties to the American Liberty League and support from Republican voters.

Roosevelt himself worked to rally support for Lewis by dispatching political allies to the state and leaning on donors to support the campaign. He entered the campaign personally in August by praising Lewis in the press as a "legislative father" of Social Security and approvingly reciting an editorial arguing Tydings "had betrayed the New Deal in the past and will again." On Labor Day weekend, he campaigned on the conservative Eastern Shore, culminating in a speech in Denton. Though the speech did not mention Tydings by name, Roosevelt praised Lewis and criticized the idea of a politician who would "pretend to be one [thing] and act like the other."

Tydings evaded ideological attacks, maintaining that he was "not running particularly as an Old Dealer nor particularly as a New Dealer but I hope as a square dealer." He framed his campaign as a defense of states' rights against individual rule by Roosevelt, which he referred to as an "invasion." Tydings supporters accused Roosevelt of a move toward "dictatorship," with one editorial calling him Stalin, Mussolini, and Hitler "rolled into one" with "a Harvard accent and a billion dollar smile." The Chicago Tribune framed the race as "Americanism against communism."

Results
Tydings easily survived the challenge. He may have benefited from the fact that sixty thousand of the Black voters who supported Roosevelt in the 1936 presidential election were registered Republicans.

Aftermath
Ultimately, Tydings reconciled with the Roosevelt administration in response to the outbreak of World War II. He was an energetic supporter of the Selective Training and Service Act of 1940, supported repeal of the American arms embargo, and voted in favor of the Lend-Lease Act.

Republican primary

Candidates
Oscar Leser, Baltimore City Judge and tax reform activist
Galen L. Tait, former Chair of the Maryland Republican Party

Results

General election

Results

See also 
 1938 United States Senate elections

Notes

References

Bibliography

Maryland
1938
United States Senate